Ultimate Collection is a compilation album by dancehall/reggae artist Buju Banton released in 2001.

Track listing
"Buju Movin'" – 3:40
"Ring the Alarm Quick" [Extended Mix] – 5:48
"How the World a Run" – 3:56
"No Respect" – 4:01
"Operation Ardent" – 3:57
"Willy (Don't Be Silly)" – 4:56
"Deportees (Things Change)" – 3:55
"Rampage" [Alternate Mix] – 3:46
"Murderer" – 3:57
"Sensemelia Persecution" – 4:03
"Champion" – 3:58
"Untold Stories" – 4:33
"Shiloh" – 0:18
"Hills and Valleys" – 4:33
"Mama Rule" – 3:19
"Love Sponge" – 3:37
"Fake Smile" [Hot Mix] – 3:45
"Give I Strength" – 4:01

References

2001 compilation albums
Buju Banton albums